The Jack's Creek Covered Bridge, also known as the Upper Covered Bridge, is a county-owned wooden covered bridge that spans the Smith River in Patrick County, Virginia, United States.

Built in 1914 (some sources say 1916), the  bridge is a queenpost truss construction over a single span. Its WGCB number is 46-68-02. The Jack's Creek Covered Bridge was listed on the National Register of Historic Places on May 22, 1973. It is the only historic covered bridge remaining in Patrick County, maintained by the Patrick County government.

History
The Jack's Creek Covered Bridge was designed by Walter G. Weaver of Woolwine and constructed in 1914 by Charlie Elam Vaughn of Buffalo Ridge, made of oak, built to serve Jack's Creek Primitive Baptist Church for which the bridge was named. Vaughn's great, great grandfather fought in the Revolutionary War. A steel-beam bridge replaced it in 1932. The Jack's Creek Covered Bridge was widened and received a new roof in 1969, followed by a full restoration by the Virginia Department of Highways in 1974, at a cost of approximately $4,550.00. Every June, the bridge is the site of the Patrick County Covered Bridge Festival.

On September 29, 2015, major flooding on the Smith River caused by days of heavy rain destroyed the nearby Bob White Covered Bridge. Jack's Creek Covered Bridge was able to survive the deluge.

See also
List of bridges on the National Register of Historic Places in Virginia
List of covered bridges in Virginia

References

 Sources
 Dale J. Travis Covered Bridges. Jack's Creek CB: Credits. Retrieved Nov. 14, 2007.
 Virginia Department of Transportation. Jack's Creek CB: Credits. Retrieved Nov. 14, 2007.
 Tc2U Photographs. Jack's Creek CB: Credits. Retrieved Nov. 14, 2007.
 Patrick County Chamber of Commerce. Jack's Creek CB: Credits. Retrieved Nov. 14, 2007.

External links 
Jack's Creek Covered Bridge (Virginia Department of Transportation)
Jack's Creek Covered Bridge (Virginia Tourism Corporation)
Jack's Creek Covered Bridge (Dale J. Travis)

Bridges completed in 1914
Buildings and structures in Patrick County, Virginia
Covered bridges on the National Register of Historic Places in Virginia
Wooden bridges in Virginia
Transportation in Patrick County, Virginia
Tourist attractions in Patrick County, Virginia
National Register of Historic Places in Patrick County, Virginia
Road bridges on the National Register of Historic Places in Virginia
Queen post truss bridges in the United States